Palais may refer to:

 Dance hall, popularly a palais de danse, in the 1950s and 1960s in the UK
 Palais, French for palace
Grand Palais, the Grand Palais des Champs-Elysées
Petit Palais, an art museum in Paris
 Palais River in the French département of Deux-Sèvres
 Palais Theatre, historic cinema ("picture palace") in Melbourne, Australia
Richard Palais (born 1931), American mathematician
Le Palais, a commune in Morbihan departement, France

See also
Palais Royal (disambiguation)
 Palai (disambiguation)
 Palace (disambiguation)
 Palas (disambiguation)